IRT may refer to:

Science and technology
 Imagery rehearsal therapy, a treatment for nightmare disorders
 Immunoreactive trypsinogen, newborn screening test for cystic fibrosis
 Infrared thermography
 Infrared Telescope (IRT), carried on Space Shuttle mission STS-51-F
 Item response theory, to interpret psychometric tests

Television
 Ice Road Truckers, a reality television series
 International Response Team, a fictional body in Criminal Minds

Other uses
 IR Tanger, a Moroccan association football club
 Incident response team, a group of people who prepare for and respond to any emergency incident
 Indiana Repertory Theatre, Indianapolis, US
 Institut für Rundfunktechnik, a German research institute for broadcasters
 Interborough Rapid Transit Company, former New York City Subway operator
 International Registry of Tartans, a textile database also known as TartanArt